Falna is a town and a tehsil in Pali District in Indian state of Rajasthan.

Demographics 
 India census, Falna had a population of 24,864. Males constitute 52% of the population and females 48%. Falna has an average literacy rate of 66%. Male literacy is 75.6%, and female literacy is 55.7%. In Falna, 12.85% of the population is under 6 years of age.

Tourism

Swaran Jain temple 
Golden Jain temple is large Jain temple built in the 19th century. The temple has an impressive gold panted façade. The temple features three curvilinear shikhara, stone pillars with elaborate carvings and pyramidal mandapa.

References

Citations

Sources 
 

Cities and towns in Pali district